Igersheim is a town in the Main-Tauber district in the German state of Baden-Württemberg.

History

Igersheim is mentioned in chronicles as early as 1090. Since 1972 Bernsfelden, Harthausen, Neuses and Simmringen belong to Igersheim.

Inhabitants

 1880: 982
 2005: 5.709
 2013: 5.504

Sights

Johann-Adam-Möhler-Haus
In this house Johann Adam Möhler was born. He is one of the famous people from Igersheim.

Burg Neuhaus castle
It was built in the 13th century. The 1st documentation of the castle dates the year 1281. It was destroyed and rebuilt in both the German Peasants' War and the Schmalkaldic War.

Today it is a place for horse breeding and middle age reenactment events.

References

Main-Tauber-Kreis
Historic Jewish communities